The 1998–99 Premier Soccer League, known as the 1998–99 Castle Premiership for sponsorship purposes, was the third season of the Premier Soccer League since its establishment in 1996. The season began on 31 July 1998 and ended on 9 June 1999. Mamelodi Sundowns became the first team in PSL history to defend their title as they won their second straight PSL title and their fifth South African title after previously winning the PSL's predecessor - the National Soccer League - on three occasions (1988, 1990 and 1993). In a hotly contested title race between Sundowns and Kaizer Chiefs it came down to goal difference to separate the two as both finished on a joint record 75 points. A margin of +5 in goal difference was all that separated the two teams as Sundowns won their second in what would be a hat-trick of PSL titles.

As before, the league was contested by 18 teams, sixteen returning from the 1997–98 season and two newly promoted clubs; Dynamos and Seven Stars. The league would also continue to run parallel to the European football calendar (August–May) and not run concurrently with the African football calendar (January–December).

Season summary

In what would become the most thrilling title race in PSL history, Mamelodi Sundowns and Kaizer Chiefs - finishing as runners-up for the third successive season - were in a class of their own as they finished 15 points ahead of third place and in the process scored 10 more league goals than the next best team.

Both clubs ended the season with a record 75 points but the Brazilians lifted the trophy thanks to a superior goal difference (+44 versus Chiefs’ +39) after a gripping finale to the season that saw them at a level pegging for the last four rounds of league games.

A 5-1 win on the last day of the season over Dynamos wasn’t enough for the Amakhosi, as Sundowns’ 2-0 win over Cape Town Spurs put them top of the pile and handed them a second successive title.

Orlando Pirates again finished third, 15 points off the pace of the top two. Manning Rangers came in fourth, level on points with the Buccaneers for the second season in a row, while newly promoted Seven Stars had a fairlytale run into fifth place. Qwa Qwa Stars came in sixth with Bloemfontein Celtic and SuperSport United rounding out the top-eight in seventh and eighth places respectively.

Soweto giants Moroka Swallows continued to disappoint as they endured a terrible season, ending 15th on the log, while Santos finished just above the relegation zone once again, albeit a lot more comfortably than they did a year ago.

The unfortunate duo to get the chop were newly promoted Dynamos and Vaal Professionals. Dynamos finished six points away from Santos and safety while Vaal Professionals endured a miserable season, amassing a dismal 21 points. Both relegated teams set unwanted records during the season as the impotent Dynamos bagged a record low 20 goals while the Vaal Professionals' porous defence shipped a record high 74 goals. Sadly, much like Real Rovers - who had been relegated the year before - relegation would prove disastrous for Vaal Professionals as they would not return to the PSL and would cease to exist entirely by the end of the decade.

Final table

References

External links
RSSSF on PSL 98/99

1998-99
1998–99 in African association football leagues
1998–99 in South African soccer